Union Sport San Vicente is a football team based in Barakaldo in the autonomous community of Basque Country. Founded in 1923, the team plays in Territorial Preferente, holding home games at Ciudad Deportiva San Vicente, with a 1,200-seat capacity.

Season to season

2 season in Tercera División

References

Football clubs in the Basque Country (autonomous community)
Association football clubs established in 1923
Divisiones Regionales de Fútbol clubs
1923 establishments in Spain
Barakaldo